The Albuquerque Swing Parade was a golf tournament on the LPGA Tour from 1961 to 1964. It was played in Albuquerque, New Mexico at the Four Hills Country Club in 1961 and 1962 and at the Paradise Hills Country Club in 1963 and 1964.

Winners
Albuquerque Pro-Am
1964 Marilynn Smith

Albuquerque Swing Parade
1963 Mickey Wright
1962 Mickey Wright

Bill Brannin's Swing Parade
1961 Betsy Rawls

References

Former LPGA Tour events
Golf in New Mexico
Recurring sporting events established in 1961
Recurring sporting events disestablished in 1964
1961 establishments in New Mexico
1964 disestablishments in New Mexico
History of women in New Mexico